USNS Spica (T-AFS-9), was a combat stores ship acquired by the U.S. Navy from the United Kingdom in 1981. She participated in Operation Fiery Vigil to evacuate Clark Air Base personnel following the Mount Pinatubo Eruption in 1991. She served as part of the Military Sealift Command until she was deactivated in 2008.

Before her U.S. Navy career, Spica served the United Kingdom's Royal Fleet Auxiliary as RFA Tarbatness (A345).

Built in England
RFA Tarbatness (A345) was built at Swan Hunter & Wigham Richardson Ltd., Wallsend-On-Tyne, England, for the Royal Fleet Auxiliary. She was laid down on 1 April 1965 and was launched on 1 February 1967.

Purchased by the U.S. Navy
Spica was purchased by the U.S. Navy and placed into non-commissioned service as a combat stores ship on 1 November 1981 as the USNS Spica (T-AFS-9), a unit of the Military Sealift Command (MSC) Naval Auxiliary Force Atlantic.

Mission
Spica’s mission was to provide underway replenishment in support of naval forces by providing refrigerated supplies, dry supplies, spare parts, general supplies, fleet freight, mail, and replacement personnel by alongside or by vertical replenishment processes.

Honors and awards
Spica  was authorized the following awards:

Disposal

Spica was inactivated on 26 January 2008 and turned over to the Inactive Ship Maintenance Facility at Philadelphia, Pennsylvania, for disposal. She was sunk as a target on 6 May 2009.

References

 

Cold War auxiliary ships of the United States
Ships built on the River Tyne
1967 ships
Sirius-class combat stores ships
Ships sunk as targets